Lisa Guerrero (born April 9, 1964) is an American journalist, actress, former sportscaster, artist, and model. Since 2006, Guerrero has been an investigative correspondent for the nationally syndicated newsmagazine Inside Edition.

Early years
Guerrero was born in Chicago, Illinois, to Walter Coles, an American of English descent, and Lucy Guerrero, who was from Chile. Guerrero spent her childhood living in San Diego, California, and Huntington Beach, California. In 1972, when she was aged eight, her mother died of lymphoma cancer. Lisa is a graduate of Edison High School in Huntington Beach, California which is located in Orange County.

Career

Early career and acting roles
Guerrero began her show-business career in the 1980s as a cheerleader for the Los Angeles Rams, after which she became Entertainment Director for the Atlanta Falcons and New England Patriots. In the 1990s, she starred in Aaron Spelling's Sunset Beach as the female jewel thief Francesca Vargas. She also guest-starred on Frasier (as Joanne, the woman Frasier meets in the airport and follows onto a plane in the Season 4 finale "Odd Man Out" and Season 5 premiere "Frasier's Imaginary Friend"), Cybill, George Lopez and In the Heat of the Night.

In 1992, Guerrero, billed under her given name Lisa Coles, made a brief appearance in the superhero film Batman Returns. Guerrero's character, credited as "Volunteer Bimbo" tells the film's villain, Penguin (Danny DeVito) that he is the coolest role-model a young person could have. The Penguin retorted by saying that she's the hottest young person a role-model could have.

In 1997, she became a sports anchor on Los Angeles' KCBS-TV and later KTTV.

Fox Sports
In 1999, Lisa Guerrero moved to the Fox Network, where she participated in shows such as Sports Geniuses, Fox Overtime, Fox Extra Innings, and the Toughman competition shows. Guerrero travelled to Egypt to tape the special Opening the Tombs of the Golden Mummies, and was the first female host of the San Diego Chargers magazine-style television show. Guerrero also co-hosted The Best Damn Sports Show Period, alongside Tom Arnold, John Salley, John Kruk and Michael Irvin.

Monday Night Football
In 2003, she left The Best Damn Sports Show Period to join ABC's Monday Night Football as a sideline reporter. Guerrero was fired from the  Monday Night Football team after one season.

Playboy
Guerrero was the celebrity cover model in the January 2006 issue of Playboy magazine, billed on the cover as "The Best Damn Sports Beauty".

Fifteen years later, Guerrero hosted the Secrets of Playboy. The show won the Critics Choice Award for Best Crime and Justice Show in 2022. Her in-studio sit down interviews with the survivors earned critical praise.

Inside Edition
On June 15, 2006, Guerrero became a correspondent on the TV news magazine Inside Edition. She later became the show's chief investigative correspondent and has worked on undercover stories and investigative reports. In 2011, she won the National Headliner Award for Best Investigative Report, beating Anderson Cooper for her undercover exposé on air duct cleaning scams.

Guerrero was nominated for a Prism Award for her story on the dangers of alcohol and boating. She was also nominated for a Genesis Award nomination for her investigation into horse slaughter farms in Florida.

In total, Guerrero has won over 35 national journalism awards and honors since becoming Inside Edition's chief investigative correspondent in 2010.

Acting
Guerrero has appeared in numerous TV and film projects throughout her forty-year career, including a starring role in Aaron Spelling's Sunset Beach, guest starring on Frasier, The George Lopez Show, In the Heat of the Night, and a recurring role in TNT's television drama series Southland. She appeared in Batman Returns and was also featured in the Bennet Miller's film starring Brad Pitt Moneyball.

Guerrero and her ex-husband, retired baseball pitcher Scott Erickson, made an independent film titled A Plumm Summer (2007). Guerrero played the lead role and was also credited as executive producer. Guerrero also co-hosted VH1's game show The World Series of Pop Culture. In 2010, Guerrero hosted the first live webcast of the 82nd Academy Awards red carpet for Oscar.com, integrating viewers' questions from Facebook into celebrity interviews. In January 2012, Guerrero hosted Shooting Stars: Salute to Service, a reality competition show on the Velocity channel.

In total, Lisa has appeared in 18 film and television projects.

Author
Guerrero wrote a memoir titled Warrior: My Path to Being Brave which was published by Hachette Books in January 2023. 

Guerrero previously wrote the book, Jewelry For Your Table, a how-to crafts treatise on table setting, published in 2016.

She has occasionally written a blog for the Los Angeles Times sports section and HuffPost.

Filmography

Self 
Inside Edition (2009–present) Chief Investigative Correspondent
Secrets of Playboy (2022) Host
Hell's Kitchen (2014) Dining room guest
Shooting Stars: Salute to Service (2012) Host
The John and Ken Show (2010) Guest
Dr. Phil (2010) Guest
Live From the Red Carpet: 82nd Academy Awards Oscar.com (2010) Host
E! True Hollywood Story (1 episode, 2009)
Headline News (2008–present) Guest
E! News (2008–present) Guest
Inside Edition (2007–2008) West Coast Correspondent
World Series of Pop Culture (8 episodes, 2006) Commentator
The Big Idea with Donny Deutsch (1 episode, 2006)
Weekends at the DL (1 episode, 2005)
Madden NFL 2006 (2005) (VG) (voice)
Beyond the Glory (1 episode, 2005)
Monday Night Football (16 episodes, 2003) Sideline Reporter
Jimmy Kimmel Live! (1 episode, 2003)
The Best Damn Sports Show Period (2001–2002) TV series
Sexiest Bachelor in America Pageant (2000) (TV) Co-Host
Southern California Sports Report (2000) TV series Host
Sports Geniuses (2000) TV series  Co-host
Extra (1994) TV series  Co-anchor
Wild West Showdown (1994)

Actress 
In the Heat of the Night (1 episode, 1990)
Matlock (1 episode, 1991)
Batman Returns (1992)
Love Potion No. 9 (1992)
Seinfeld (1 episode, 1994)
Cybill (1 episode, 1996)
Fire Down Below (1997)
Frasier (2 episodes, 1997)
Sunset Beach (1998–1999, 86 episodes)  Francesca Vargas 
George Lopez (episode "Feel the Burn", 2003) Linda Lorenzo
Today You Die (2005)
A Plumm Summer (2007)
Winged Creatures (2008)
Victorious (pilot, 2010)  
Southland (2010-2011)
Moneyball (2011)

Producer 
A Plumm Summer (2007)

Books

References

External links
 

1964 births
Actresses from Chicago
American film actresses
American infotainers
American people of Chilean descent
American soap opera actresses
American television sports announcers
American television reporters and correspondents
Figure skating commentators
Golf writers and broadcasters
Living people
National Football League announcers
National Football League cheerleaders
Women sports announcers
American cheerleaders
American women television journalists
Inside Edition
21st-century American women